McElwee Houses is a national historic district located at Statesville, Iredell County, North Carolina.  It encompasses four contributing buildings in a predominantly residential section of Statesville.  The district includes notable examples of Classical Revival and Colonial Revival architecture and were built in the first decade of the 20th century. They were built by members of the John H. McElwee family, a prominent family of industrialists in the late-19th and early-20th century.

It was listed on the National Register of Historic Places in 1980.

References

Houses on the National Register of Historic Places in North Carolina
Historic districts on the National Register of Historic Places in North Carolina
Colonial Revival architecture in North Carolina
Neoclassical architecture in North Carolina
Geography of Iredell County, North Carolina
National Register of Historic Places in Iredell County, North Carolina
Houses in Iredell County, North Carolina